Palhi  is a village development committee in Nawalparasi District in the Lumbini Zone of southern Nepal. At the time of the 1991 Nepal census it had a population of 4133 people living in 625 individual households. The only spoken language here in Bhojpuri(Awadhi); about 99% of the population speak bhojpuri and the remaining speak tharu, nepali and Urdu(<1%). The Palhi Bhagawati Mandir is a holy temple of goddess durga. Thousands of people worship in this temple during the festive season of nawami(dureshara). It is believed that what you wish for will be fulfilled if you visit the temple. The temple is very much popular in the district. Most of the people are under poverty line. Even in this century, the villages don't have access to roads and education. There is only one higher secondary school in the VDC.But, most of the youngsters travel to foreign for money. Very less students migrate to the Capital for higher studies.

References

Populated places in Parasi District